Valros is a commune in the Hérault department in the Occitanie region in southern France.

Population

Sights and monuments
Fort de Valros (also known locally as Tour de Valros) is a ruined small castle or fortress. In the mid-19th century, the fort was the site of a semaphore station.

See also
Communes of the Hérault department

References

Communes of Hérault